Mordellistenoda donan is a beetle in the genus Mordellistenoda of the family Mordellidae. It was described in 2004 by Tsuru.

It has been found in the Yonaguni and Ishigaki Islands.

References

Mordellidae
Beetles described in 2004
Insects of Japan